Teratodinae is a subfamily of grasshoppers in the family Acrididae. There are about 8 genera and more than 20 described species, found in East Africa and South-West Asia.

Genera
These eight genera belong to the subfamily Teratodinae:
 Acrostegastes Karsch, 1896
 Esfandiaria - monotypic E.  obesa Popov, 1951
 Eurynotacris Ramme, 1931
 Kabulia Ramme, 1928
 Lyrotyloides - monotypic L. viridis Bey-Bienko, 1956
 Lyrotylus Uvarov, 1923
 Robecchia Schulthess, 1898
 Teratodes Brullé, 1835

References

Further reading

 
 
 

Acrididae
Orthoptera subfamilies